Sam Zajac (born 23 June 1989) is an English professional ice hockey defenceman currently playing for the Leeds Knights of the National Ice Hockey League. He spent the 2019-20 season as player/coach of Leeds.

External links

1989 births
Living people
Basingstoke Bison players
Braehead Clan players
English ice hockey defencemen
Leeds Chiefs players
Leeds Knights players
Manchester Storm (2015–) players
Newcastle Vipers players
Swindon Wildcats players
Telford Tigers players
Whitley Warriors players
People from Whitley Bay
Sportspeople from Tyne and Wear